Carlos José Bustamante (born 1951 in Lima, Peru) is a Peruvian-American scientist. He is a member of the National Academy of Sciences.

Biography
Carlos Bustamante is a Howard Hughes Medical Institute (HHMI) investigator, professor of molecular and cell biology, physics, and chemistry at the University of California, Berkeley, and Biophysicist Faculty Scientist at the Lawrence Berkeley National Laboratory.
Bustamante studied medicine at National University of San Marcos before discovering his true interest in biochemistry. He received his BSc from Cayetano Heredia University in Lima, his MSc in biochemistry from National University of San Marcos in Lima, and his PhD in biophysics from UC Berkeley, where he studied with Ignacio Tinoco, Jr. As a postdoctoral fellow at the Lawrence Berkeley National Laboratory, Bustamante studied with Marcos Maestre. Before moving to Berkeley, he was an HHMI investigator at the University of Oregon.

Research focus
Carlos Bustamante uses novel methods of single-molecule visualization, such as scanning force microscopy, to study the structure and function of nucleoprotein assemblies. His laboratory is developing methods of single-molecule manipulation, such as optical tweezers, to characterize the elasticity of DNA, to induce the mechanical unfolding of individual protein molecules, and to investigate the machine-like behavior of molecular motors.

Positions
 Research Assistant, UC Berkeley (1976–1981)
 Postdoctoral Fellow, Lawrence Berkeley Laboratory, UC Berkeley (1981–1982)
 Assistant Professor, Department of Chemistry, University of New Mexico (1982–1986)
 Associate Professor, Department of Chemistry, University of New Mexico (1986–1989)
 Professor of Chemistry, Department of Chemistry, University of New Mexico (1989–1990)
 Professor of Chemistry and Member of the Institute of Molecular Biology, University of Oregon (1991–1998)
 Professor in Molecular and Cell Biology, Chemistry, and Physics, UC Berkeley (1998–present)
 Honorary Professor, National University of San Marcos, Lima, Peru

Fellowships and awards
 Kellogg Foundation scholarship during the Master in Biochemistry (1973–1975)
 Fulbright Commission and Institute of International Education Fellow (1975–1976)
 Abraham Rosenberg scholarship, UC Berkeley (1975–1976)
 Searle Scholar (1984)
 Alfred P. Sloan Foundation Fellow (1985)
 Presidential Lecturer in Chemistry, University of New Mexico (1986)
 State of New Mexico Eminent Scholar (1989)
 Howard Hughes Medical Institute Investigator (1994–1998, 2000–present)
 Elected Fellow of the American Physical Society (1995), Citation: For pioneering the application of optical methods and scanning probes in measurements of the properties of single DNA molecules.
 Member of the Science Advisory Board of the Searle Scholars Program (1997–2000)
 Member of the Board of Trustees at the IMDEA Nanoscience Institute
 Elected member, National Academy of Sciences, Biophysics 2002
 Max Delbrück Prize in Biological Physics (2002)
 Hans Neurath Award of the Protein Society (2004) 
 In 2005 he received the Richtmyer Memorial Award given annually by the American Association of Physics Teachers.
 Alexander Hollaender Award in Biophysics (2004)
 Doctor Honoris Causa of National University of San Marcos, Lima, Peru
 Vilcek Prize in Biomedical Science (2012) 
 Raymond and Beverly Sackler International Prize in the Physical Sciences (2012)

References

External links 

1951 births
Members of the United States National Academy of Sciences
Living people
People from Lima
Peruvian chemists
American chemists
Peruvian emigrants to the United States
National University of San Marcos alumni
University of California, Berkeley alumni
Howard Hughes Medical Investigators
University of Oregon faculty
Fellows of the American Physical Society
UC Berkeley College of Chemistry faculty
Hispanic and Latino American scientists
Hispanic and Latino American physicists